Tinogasta is a western department of Catamarca Province in Argentina.

See also
Copacabana
Laguna Negra, Catamarca

External links

Tinogasta Webpage (Spanish)
Welcome Argentina page

Departments of Catamarca Province